Facundo Ardusso (born 24 June 1988) is an Argentine racing driver. He has run in different series, with major success in Argentine Formula Renault and TC 2000.
He was fourth at Punta del Este, 21 March 2010.

Awards
2009 Revelation Clarín Awards

Career 
2006: Argentine Formula Renault (Crespi)
2007: Argentine Formula Renault (Crespi)
2008: Argentine Formula Renault (Crespi)
2009: Argentine Formula Renault (Crespi) Champion
2010: TC 2000 Toyota Team Argentina (Toyota Corolla)

References

External links
Driver's blog

Argentine racing drivers
TC 2000 Championship drivers
Formula Renault Argentina drivers
1988 births
Living people
Turismo Carretera drivers
Súper TC 2000 drivers